Ashton is a hamlet in the English county of Cambridgeshire. It falls within Bainton civil parish, part of the city of Peterborough unitary authority.

References

External links

Hamlets in Cambridgeshire
Geography of Peterborough